Afonso Rodrigues da Silva (born July 24, 1974) is a former Angolan basketball player.  He was listed at 6’3” and 203 pounds.

See also
 Angola national basketball team

References

External links
RealGM profile

1974 births
Living people
Basketball players from Luanda
Angolan men's basketball players
Small forwards
C.D. Primeiro de Agosto men's basketball players
African Games gold medalists for Angola
African Games medalists in basketball
2002 FIBA World Championship players
Competitors at the 2003 All-Africa Games